Stop the violence may refer to:

 "Stop the Violence Movement", started by KRS-One
  "Stop the Violence", a song by Boogie Down Productions from the album By All Means Necessary
 A slogan used in civil rights movements and other organizations, such as:
Gender Equality Bureau
Hip Hop Caucus
 Stop the Violence campaign by radio station KHUM
 Stop the Violence screening tour for the film Sin by Silence
 Stop the Violence Committee in Seattle, which featured an artwork by Gerard Tsutakawa
 "Stop the Violence", song by Mo' Hits All Stars from the album Curriculum Vitae
 "Stop D Violence", a slogan by clothing brand Cross Colours
 "Stop the Violence", song by The Silvertones
 "Stop the Violence", song by A Global Threat from the album What the Fuck Will Change?

See also 
 Stop Violence, 2002 Malayalam action film directed by A. K. Sajan
 Stop Violence Against Women